Club Baloncesto Tíjola, more commonly referred today by its sponsorship name Promobys Tíjola, is a professional Basketball team based in the town of Tíjola in Almería, Andalusia. On 2011, the club resigned to the berth in LEB Plata.

Season by season

References

External links
Official website

Defunct basketball teams in Spain
Former LEB Plata teams
Basketball teams established in 1992
Basketball teams disestablished in 2011
1992 establishments in Spain
2011 disestablishments in Spain
Basketball teams in Andalusia